Worcester Warriors Women, currently known as the University of Worcester Warriors for partnership reasons, and formerly known as Worcester Valkyries, are a women's rugby union club in Worcester, Worcestershire, England. They were founded in 1993, as Worcester Ladies, and play in the Premier 15s. They were originally created as the women's team of Worcester Wanderers, but became part of the English Premiership team Worcester Warriors' organisation ahead of the 2016/17 season.

History 
Worcester Ladies were formed in 1993 by Mark Edwards, who also set up women's rugby union teams at Droitwich RFC and Malvern RFC. They initially played in the national leagues. In 1998, they were promoted into the Women's Premiership for the first time. Worcester Ladies has close links with the University of Worcester with some players playing for both Worcester Ladies and the University of Worcester's women's rugby union team. In 2013, Worcester Ladies won their first Women's Premiership title after a bonus-point victory against Wasps Ladies to stop Richmond Women winning a fourth consecutive title.

Worcester Ladies have a local rivalry with Lichfield Ladies. Being affiliated to Worcester Warriors, Worcester Ladies play their home matches at Worcester Warriors' Sixways Stadium.

In August 2022, Warriors Women and the University of Worcester agreed a multi-year landmark deal which would see the team renamed University of Worcester Warriors.

Due to ongoing financial difficulties experienced in 2022. Worcester Warriors Women were suspended from all competitions on 26 September 2022 and the company was placed into administration.

The suspension was temporarily lifted  on 26 October when it was confirmed that University of Worcester Warriors had received funding and insurance to compete until Christmas 2022.

Notable players 
Worcester Ladies have had a number of internationals play for them. Joanne Yapp, Samantha Dale and Kat Marchant both played for the England women's national rugby union team. Former England women's captain, Catherine Spencer also played for Worcester. Donna Kennedy played for both Worcester and the Scotland women's national rugby union team, whom she earned 100 caps for.
The current squad includes England internationals Lydia Thompson (rugby union), Laura Keates and Canadian international Paige Farries

Coaching 
In 2010, Worcester Ladies hired former Jersey player, Luke Fisher as their head coach.

In June 2017, the Valkyries appointed former Bristol Ladies Head Coach Roy Davies as Director of Rugby

In October 2019, former  captain Jo Yapp took over as director of rugby

References 

Women's rugby union teams in England
Rugby clubs established in 1993
Worcester Warriors